The Junior Eurovision Song Contest 2017 was the fifteenth edition of the annual Junior Eurovision Song Contest, organised by the Georgian Public Broadcaster (GPB) and the European Broadcasting Union (EBU). It took place on 26 November 2017 at the Olympic Palace, in the Georgian capital, Tbilisi. This was the fifth time that the contest was hosted by the  winning country. The visual design and contest slogan, "Shine Bright", were revealed in May 2017.

The winner was Polina Bogusevich, who represented  with the song "Wings", marking the second time that Russia has won the Junior Eurovision Song Contest, and the first time since The Tolmachevy Twins in 2006, and the third overall victory for the country in any Eurovision-related events. The last victory in any Eurovision event for Russia was when Dima Bilan won the Eurovision Song Contest 2008 in Belgrade.  and  finished in second and third place, respectively.

Location 

During the Winner's Press Conference of the Junior Eurovision Song Contest 2016, Jon Ola Sand - Head of Live Events, announced that the EBU would invite broadcasting members to submit applications to host the 2017 contest, which would take place on 26 November 2017.

Georgian Public Broadcaster (GPB) announced on 22 November 2016 that they had begun talks with the EBU in connection to hosting the 2017 contest.

The EBU confirmed in February 2017 that the contest would be hosted by Georgia. This was the first Eurovision event hosted by the country, despite them winning a record three times. It was confirmed on 26 February 2017 that Tbilisi would host the contest.

Venue 
On 16 March 2017, it was announced that the Tbilisi Sports Palace would be the host venue for the contest. However, on 9 August 2017, the venue was changed to the 4,000-capacity Olympic Palace in Tbilisi which was considered more suitable for hosting the contest.

Officially opened on 13 July 2015 by Georgian Prime Minister, Irakli Garibashvili, the venue was built to host the 2015 European Youth Summer Olympic Festival. The complex features two halls that are capable of hosting several sporting events.

Format

Visual design

The theme for the contest, Shine Bright, was unveiled on 12 May 2017 during a press conference prior to the 2017 Eurovision Song Contest in Kyiv. The emblem is a multi-coloured, stylized sun, representing a "burst" of expression; Jon Ola Sand explained that the theme reflected the goal of the Junior Eurovision Song Contest to give youth "a moment to shine and an opportunity to showcase their full potential as young artists".

Language
The original rules of the competition were changed, allowing up to 40% of each song to be in a language other than the national language of the representative's country, instead of 25% as in previous years. This allowed countries, such as the winner, Russia, to have both a verse and a chorus in English, rather than just a chorus.

Hosts

On 3 October 2017, it was announced that Helen Kalandadze and Lizi Japaridze would host the contest. Japaridze is the third person under the age of sixteen to ever host the Junior Eurovision Song Contest, after Ioana Ivan in 2006 and Dmytro Borodin in 2009, and also the first former participant to host an edition of the contest. Japaridze previously represented Georgia in the Junior Eurovision Song Contest 2014, where she placed eleventh with the song "Happy Day". Kalandadze is a television presenter and singer, who previously was a backing singer for Georgia's 2010 Eurovision entry "Shine" by Sofia Nizharadze.

Voting
The results were determined by national juries and an online audience vote. Every country used a national jury that consisted of three music industry professionals and two kids aged between 10 and 15 who were citizens of the country they represent. The first phase of the online voting started on 24 November 2017 when a recap of all the rehearsal performances were shown on the official website before the viewers could vote. Following this recap, voters had the option to watch longer one-minute clips from each participant's rehearsal. This first round of voting ended on 26 November at 15:59 CET. The second phase of the online voting took place during the live show and started after the last performance and was open for 15 minutes. International viewers could vote for a minimum of three countries and a maximum of five. For the first time, viewers could also vote for their own country's song.

The number of points were determined by the percentage of votes received. The public vote counted for 50% of the final result, while the other 50% came from the professional juries.

Trophy
The trophy was designed by Kjell Engman of the Swedish glass company Kosta Boda. Engman also designed the adult contest trophy. From this year, the design of the trophy was unified and awarded to the subsequent winners. The main trophy was a glass microphone with colored lines inside the upper part, which symbolize the flow of sound.

Opening
The show was opened by last year's winner Mariam Mamadashvili performing her entry with a choir and was followed by the flag parade accompanied by the theme song "Shine Bright", composed by Giga Kukhianidze and Gordon Bonello.

Participating countries 

On 9 August 2017, it was confirmed that sixteen countries would take part in the contest. Portugal marked their first appearance since , while Bulgaria and Israel withdrew.

Detailed voting results

12 points 
Below is a summary of all 12 points received from each country's professional juries.

Spokespersons 

 Maria Christophorou
 Dominika Ptak 
 Thijs Schlimback
 Lilit Tokhatyan
 Saba Karazanashvili
 Duarte Valença 
 Walter McCabe
 Kjara Blažev
 Lizi Tavberidze
 Sabjana Rizvanu
 Sofia Rol
 Mariam Andghuladze
 Tonya Volodina
 Mina Grujić
 Liam Clarke
 Sofia Bartoli

Other countries
For a country to be eligible for potential participation in the Junior Eurovision Song Contest, it needs to be an active member of the European Broadcasting Union (EBU). It is currently unknown whether the EBU issue invitations of participation to all 56 active members like they do for the Eurovision Song Contest.

Active EBU members
 The Austrian national broadcaster, ORF, announced on 31 May 2017 that they would not debut in the contest in 2017, with no intention to participate for the next few years.
 On 23 May 2017, the Bulgarian national broadcaster, Bulgarian National Television (BNT), provisionally confirmed their participation in the 2017 contest. However, on 7 June 2017, it was revealed that due to the election of the company's new Director-General, that the broadcaster had withdrawn its application. On 22 September 2017, it was announced that Bulgaria would not participate in the contest.
 The Croatian national broadcaster, Hrvatska radiotelevizija (HRT), had confirmed that the broadcaster was looking at the possibility of returning to the contest in 2017. However, Croatia was not on the final list of participants released by the EBU. 
 On 13 July 2017, Hungarian national broadcaster Médiaszolgáltatás-támogató és Vagyonkezelő Alap (MTVA) stated that they were not ruling out a debut at the 2017 contest. However, on 25 July 2017, MTVA announced that they would not debut in 2017.
 The Israel Broadcasting Authority (IBA) shut down on 9 May 2017. The new broadcasting network Israeli Public Broadcasting Corporation (IPBC, "KAN") was not a member of the EBU at the time, which was a requirement to participate in the contest. It was revealed on 6 July 2017 that an agreement had been signed between the EBU and IPBC, allowing the broadcaster to participate in EBU contests such as the Junior Eurovision Song Contest, despite not having full membership. Israel was not on the final list of participants released by the EBU, however IPBC still broadcast the contest.

Broadcasts

Official album
Junior Eurovision Song Contest Tbilisi 2017 is a compilation album put together by the European Broadcasting Union, and was released by Universal Music Group on 10 November 2017. The album features all the songs from the 2017 contest.

See also
ABU International Dance Festival 2017
Bala Turkvision Song Contest 2017
Eurovision Choir of the Year 2017
Eurovision Song Contest 2017
Eurovision Young Dancers 2017
Turkvision Song Contest 2017

References

External links 

 
2017
2017 song contests
2017 in Georgia (country)
Events in Tbilisi
November 2017 events in Europe